This is a list of museums in Senegal.

List 
  (CRDS)
 IFAN Museum of African Arts
Historical Museum of Senegal in Gorée
 Maison des Esclaves de Gorée
 Musée Boribana
 Musée d'Art Africain
 Musée de la Culture Diola
 Musée de la Femme Henriette Bathily
 Musée de la Mer
 Musée des Forces Armées Senegalaise
 Musée Géologique Africain
 Musée Régional de Tambacounda
 Musée Régional de Thiès
 Musée Senghor Fondation

See also 
 List of museums

References

External links 
 Museums in Senegal

 
Senegal
Museums
Museums
Museums
Senegal